Mount Pontida is the ice-covered mountain rising to 1965 m in Havre Mountains, northern Alexander Island in Antarctica. It surmounts Hadzhiev Glacier to the north, Foreman Glacier to the southeast and Wubbold Glacier to the southwest. British mapping in 1971. The feature is named after the hypothetical lost land of Pontida located in Black Sea.

Location

Maps
 British Antarctic Territory. Scale 1:200000 topographic map. DOS 610 – W 69 70. Tolworth, UK, 1971
 Antarctic Digital Database (ADD). Scale 1:250000 topographic map of Antarctica. Scientific Committee on Antarctic Research (SCAR). Since 1993, regularly upgraded and updated

Notes

References
 Bulgarian Antarctic Gazetteer. Antarctic Place-names Commission. (details in Bulgarian, basic data in English)
 Mount Pontida. SCAR Composite Gazetteer of Antarctica

External links
 Mount Pontida. Copernix satellite image

Pontida
Bulgaria and the Antarctic